The 2004 Swisscom Challenge, also known as the Zurich Open, was a women's tennis tournament played on indoor hard courts that was part of the Tier I Series of the 2004 WTA Tour. It was the 21st edition of the tournament and took place at the Schluefweg in Zürich, Switzerland, from 17 October until 24 October 2004. Unseeded Alicia Molik won the singles title and earned $189,000 first-prize money.

Finals

Singles

 Alicia Molik defeated  Maria Sharapova 4–6, 6–2, 6–3
 It was Molik's 2nd singles title of the year and the 3rd of her career.

Doubles

 Cara Black /  Rennae Stubbs defeated  Virginia Ruano Pascual /  Paola Suárez 6–4, 6–4

References

External links
 ITF tournament edition details
 Tournament draws

Swisscom Challenge
2004
2004 in Swiss tennis
October 2004 sports events in Europe
2004 in Swiss women's sport